Jihad Dib (born 1973) is an Australian politician who was elected at the 2015 New South Wales state election to the Legislative Assembly as the member for Lakemba representing the Labor Party. He was the only Muslim MP to represent the Lakemba seat which had the highest proportion of Muslims in NSW and the first Muslim MP in the NSW lower house.

Early life and career
Dib was born in Lebanon and migrated to Australia with his family when he was two years old. He began his career as a teacher at Ulladulla High School. He was principal of Punchbowl Boys High School from 2007 to 2014. Dib is acknowledged for changing a tough school into a respected community facility. He had previously served on the Australia Day Council of New South Wales, the New South Wales Police Commissioner's Advisory Panel and the SBS Community Advisory Committee, and was awarded a Pride of Australia award in 2013.

Political career
Following the resignation of Shadow Minister for Education Linda Burney to contest the federal seat of Barton, Dib was appointed to replace her in the portfolio. He served as Shadow Education Minister in the shadow ministries of Luke Foley and Michael Daley. Following the 2019 election, Dib was appointed as Shadow Minister for Youth, Juvenile Justice, Skills and TAFE and Shadow Minister Assisting on Multiculturalism in the shadow Ministry of Jodi McKay. In 2021, he was moved to the Emergency Services, Energy and Climate Change portfolios in the frontbench led by Chris Minns. Dib's seat of Lakemba was abolished by the New South Wales Electoral Commission prior to the 2023 election and Dib registered to contest the neighbouring seat of Bankstown.

Personal life
Dib is married to Erin, who graduated as a Japanese teacher in the same year as he graduated, and with whom he has three children. His brother is boxing champion Billy Dib.

References

Living people
Australian Labor Party members of the Parliament of New South Wales
Members of the New South Wales Legislative Assembly
Australian headmasters
1973 births
Place of birth missing (living people)
University of Wollongong alumni
Australian Muslims
Lebanese emigrants to Australia
Australian schoolteachers
21st-century Australian politicians